Baruch Yehudah Shemtov (born September 22, 1987) is an entertainment reporter, journalist, fashion designer, and entrepreneur. He was the Entertainment Anchor on Good Day New York on Fox 5 NY WNYW from 2017 to 2019. He was the New York Correspondent for Young Hollywood, a Special Correspondent for Extra. Shemtov founded a line of ties that currently sell in Japan at Journal Standard's TRISECT, and online at Zozotown.

Early life
Baruch Yehudah Shemtov was born in Philadelphia on September 22, 1987 to Chantzie Annette Meth (née Waldman) and Dr. Menachem Mendel Shemtov, a urologist (son of Abraham Shemtov). His family moved to Manhattan when he was a year old and his parents separated when he was six.

Growing up, Shemtov enjoyed spending time in art galleries and antique shops, and at eight years old he was designing his own fashion lines with magic markers and construction paper. For a history paper in grade eight, he researched Ralph Lauren as having had a significant impact on American history. Shemtov attended the Ramaz School, and by his senior year he had completed classes at the Fashion Institute of Technology and interned with Jonathan Adler and Ralph Lauren Corporation.

When Shemtov was fifteen years old and "fed up with his school dress code", he turned a "very typical powder-blue cowboy bandana" into a necktie and wore it the next day. "People loved it and wanted me to make it for them," he shared with CNN in 2005. Shemtov also came up with a new concept which he named the "double tie," a necktie with a second tie stitched on its top half.

Aside from fashion and design, Shemtov made his on-camera debut as the narrator for Chabad.org's "Chanukah Play" when he was five years old.

He graduated from high school in 2005 and earned a Bachelor of Arts degree in psychology from Harvard College in 2009. Shemtov attended Harvard Business School from 2013 to 2014, but took a leave of absence to pursue his media career.

Fashion career
In 2003, at age fifteen, Shemtov pitched his hand-stitched prototype neckties to retailers and began working with a New York manufacturer to produce them. His ties debuted at Jelly in Boerum Hill, Brooklyn, and were then sold at Cantaloup and Takashimaya where his first collection, consisting of his signature “double tie,” a kimono tie, and a bold metallic mesh tie, sold out. His ties were modeled at New York Fashion Week in Bryant Park later that year.

Shemtov's story garnered press around the world, and he was featured in The New York Times, New York, The Times, Toro, GQ (Japanese edition), and other publications. He also made appearances with his designs on CNN, E!, PBS, and NBC, including a special story on The Today Show. In a few early press interviews, Shemtov shared that he hosts all his business meetings at The Carlyle and that he got some of his best business advice from Donald Trump, who told Shemtov, "Sell a lot of ties."

In 2005, Shemtov began designing women's T-shirts. He launched a limited edition collection that premiered alongside his neckties at Kaje on Rodeo Drive in Los Angeles. They were later sold at Fivestory on New York's Madison Avenue.

Shemtov was a finalist in Russell Simmons' Race to BE entrepreneurship competition, and opened the New York Stock Exchange with Simmons in November 2008. Shemtov was also featured in an episode of PBS's Biz Kid$ and closed the NASDAQ with the show in April 2009.

Today, Shemtov's ties are sold in Japan; at Journal Standard's TRISECT, and online at Zozotown.

Media career
After graduating from Harvard College in 2009, Shemtov worked at CNN, and hosted a series of video interviews called "Baruch.tv" on The Huffington Post. Shemtov began working with genConnect (a media website designed to "connect audiences with world-class experts") in December 2011. Shemtov first joined Young Hollywood in 2012. He soon became the official New York correspondent for the network, and worked there through 2015. In 2012 Shemtov also began working at Waywire as well as Extra where he is a special correspondent.

In June 2014, Shemtov began making appearances on WNYW- FOX 5 on Friday Night Live, the 5 p.m. and 10 p.m. newscasts. and other segments as a freelance reporter.

References

External links
Official webpage

1987 births
Living people
American people of Russian-Jewish descent
Harvard Business School alumni
Harvard College alumni
New York (state) television reporters
Ramaz School alumni